Sumanene is a polycyclic aromatic hydrocarbon and of scientific interest because the molecule can be considered a fragment of buckminsterfullerene. Suman means "sunflower" in both Hindi and Sanskrit. The core of the arene is a benzene ring and the periphery consists of alternating benzene rings (3) and cyclopentadiene rings (3). Unlike fullerene, sumanene has benzyl positions which are available for organic reactions.

Organic synthesis 
The structure of Sumanene can be inferred from oxidation of 1,5,9-trimethyltriphenylene but the first practical synthesis starts from norbornadiene. Norbornadiene is converted into a stannane by action of n-butyllithium, dibromoethane and tributyltinchloride. An Ullmann reaction of this stannane with CuTC affords the benzene core. The methylene bridges (--) created in this conversion then migrate in a tandem ring-opening metathesis and ring-closing metathesis by the Grubbs' catalyst. The final structure is obtained by oxidation by DDQ.

Properties 
Sumanene is a bowl-shaped molecule with a bowl depth of 118 picometers. The 6 hub carbon atoms are pyramidalized by 9° and the molecule displays considerable bond alternation (138.1 to 143.1 pm). Sumanene also experiences bowl-to-bowl inversion with an inversion barrier of 19.6 kcal/mol (82 kJ/mol) at 140 °C which is much higher than that found for its corannulene cousin.
Like any benzylic proton, the sumanene protons can be abstracted by a strong base such as t-butyl lithium to form the sumanene mono carbanion. This strong nucleophile can react with an electrophile such as trimethylsilyl chloride to the trimethylsilyl derivative.

The trianion has also been reported. Electron transport properties have been investigated  as well as carbon NMR

Derivatives 
Sumanene derivatives  such as  naphtosumanene  and trisialsumanene  have been described. Chiral sumanenes are of some interest with respect to inherent chirality, examples are chiral trimethylsumanene  and a chiral sumanene cyclopentadienyl iron complex

References 

Geodesic polyarenes
Polycyclic aromatic hydrocarbons